Vili Beroš (born 13 December 1964) is a Croatian politician and neurosurgeon serving as Minister of Health since 2020. 

On 19 November 2020, it was announced that Minister Beroš had tested positive for the COVID-19 amid its pandemic in Croatia.

His tenure as minister has been marked by efforts to deal with the COVID-19 pandemic in Croatia, which, as of March 2021, has affected over 150,000 people in Croatia. Croatia had also been presided over the Council of the European Union between January and June 2020, which occasionally entailed holding meetings of ministers of health from all 27 member states of the European Union, which are chaired by the minister from the presiding country.

References 

1964 births
Living people
Politicians from Split, Croatia
Health ministers of Croatia
Physicians from Split, Croatia
Croatian neurosurgeons